Ronald MacDonald was a New Zealand rugby league footballer who represented New Zealand between 1909 and 1911.

Rugby union career
MacDonald originally played rugby union and represented Auckland as a wing-forward.

Rugby league career
MacDonald, a halfback from Auckland, was part of Auckland's original 1908 rugby league team. He first represented New Zealand during the 1909 tour of Australia, playing in all three Test matches. MacDonald scored a try in the first Test match.

MacDonald was again selected for New Zealand for the first Test match in New Zealand, against the 1910 Great Britain Lions. MacDonald scored a try in the match. He was part of the Auckland tour of New Zealand at the end of the year.

MacDonald was part of the 1911 New Zealand side that toured Australia, playing against New South Wales and Queensland. He was Auckland's sole Auckland selector in 1911 and later served as a national selector and as Auckland's delegate to the New Zealand Rugby League.

References

Living people
New Zealand rugby league players
New Zealand national rugby league team players
Auckland rugby league team players
Rugby league wingers
Rugby league five-eighths
Rugby league halfbacks
Auckland rugby union players
New Zealand rugby union players
New Zealand rugby league administrators
New Zealand Rugby League board members
Ponsonby Ponies players
North Shore Albions players
Rugby union wing-forwards
Year of birth missing (living people)